Morris Stroud Jr. (May 17, 1946 – October 17, 2016) was a tight end for the Kansas City Chiefs from 1969 to 1974. He did not play in the 1969 regular season but was on the roster for the 1969 AFL Championship Game. At 6 foot 10 inches tall, Stroud is believed to have been the tallest tight end, and the second tallest player at any position, in the history of the NFL.

As a student at Clark Atlanta University, a historically black college in Atlanta, Georgia, the Miami, Florida-born Stroud was a center and power forward on the Panthers' basketball team. Despite Stroud having little experience in football, Chiefs head coach Hank Stram selected him in the third round of the 1969 NFL Draft as a tight end. 

In five seasons between 1970 and 1974, Stroud caught 54 passes for 977 yards, seven touchdowns, and averaged 18.1 yards per reception.  However, Stroud became a notable special teams player—specifically at blocking field goals. On many opponents' field goal attempts, Stroud lined up under the goalposts and tried to deflect the ball as it came down. Later rule changes led to the adoption of Rule 12, Section 3, Article 1 (informally known as the "Stroud Rule"):  "Goal tending by any player leaping up to deflect a kick as it passes above the crossbar of a goal post is prohibited. The referee may award 3 points for a palpably unfair act".

Stroud died on October 17, 2016 in Kansas City, Missouri.

See also 
 Other American Football League players

References

External links
 ESPN article

1946 births
2016 deaths
Players of American football from Miami
American football tight ends
Clark Atlanta Panthers football players
Kansas City Chiefs players
American Football League players